Astanjin (also Romanized as Āstanjīn, Astānjīn, and Āstānajīn; also known as Asnānjīn, Astaniya, and Āstatjīn) is a village in Kaghazkonan-e Markazi Rural District of Kaghazkonan District, Mianeh County, East Azerbaijan province, Iran. At the 2006 National Census, its population was 421 in 106 households. The following census in 2011 counted 296 people in 93 households. The latest census in 2016 showed a population of 255 people in 96 households; it was the largest village in its rural district.

The people of this village speak Azerbaijani. The main occupation of the people of this village is animal husbandry and agriculture. Some Astanjini people work in the village in spring and summer and work in Tehran in autumn and winter. Most Astanjins living in Tehran live in Aliabad and Yakhchi Abad and cooperate in many cultural and social activities.

The climate of this village is usually cool in spring and summer and the first half of autumn and cold in winter and the second half of autumn. Astanjin village has extensive agricultural lands and gardens. The agricultural products of this village are mostly wheat and lentils. Also in its gardens, in addition to many walnut and mulberry trees can be found, you can find a variety of fruits such as apples, pears, cherries, hawthorn, grapes, plums, figs, berries and .... The people of this village provide their dairy products with livestock and their cattle and sheep. In this village two shrines are visited by the villagers and the surrounding villages. These two shrines are named after Imamzadeh Ali and Imamzadeh Mohammad, which are registered on the official website The Imams of the country  and are the descendants of Imam Jafar Sadegh. This village has a school and a health house, as well as a satellite TV and telecommunication tower. A health house with medium facilities named after Martyr Mohammad Sepehri and Martyr Saeed Naseri has been built in it. The school of this village is named after Martyr Ayvaz Rafiei. The gardens of this village are divided into three main parts: "dermanlar", "Guney" and "Guzey", which respectively, mean the place of mills and sunshade, and the place of shade. Water piping has been done in this village and the villagers also benefit from electricity and gas.

Among the unfinished projects in this village is the Hadi project in recent years, which has remained half-finished due to lack of budget. To expand the inner road of the village, some villagers took steps to develop the village by donating their land.

References 

Meyaneh County

Populated places in East Azerbaijan Province

Populated places in Meyaneh County